This is a list of notable individuals born and residing mainly in Lebanon.

Lebanese expatriates residing overseas and possessing Lebanese citizenship are also included.

Activists
Lydia Canaan – activist, advocate, public speaker, and United Nations delegate
Jill Kelley – advocate, socialite, and former diplomat
Sandra Melhem – LGBT rights activist 
Aya Mouallem (born 1998) zi– electrical engineer, and gender equality activist

Arts and entertainment

Beauty pageant winners

Dina Azar – Miss Lebanon 1995
Joëlle Behlock – Miss Lebanon 1997
Valerie Abou Chacra – Miss Lebanon 2015
Jihane Almira Chedid – Puteri Indonesia Pariwisata 2020, Miss Supranational Asia 2021
Rina Chibany – Miss Lebanon 2012
Rima Fakih – Miss USA 2010
Sonia Fares – Miss Lebanon 1969
Lamitta Frangieh – Miss World Lebanon 2004
Karen Ghrawi – Miss Lebanon 2013
Saly Greige – Miss Lebanon 2014
Perla Helou – Miss Lebanon 2017
Annabella Hilal – Miss World Lebanon 2006
Dominique Hourani – Miss Intercontinental 2003
Bethany Kehdy – Miss World Lebanon 2001
Nadine Wilson Njeim – Miss Lebanon 2007
Nadine Nassib Njeim – Miss Lebanon 2004
Gabrielle Bou Rached – Miss Lebanon 2005
Daniella Rahme – Miss International Lebanon 2010
Maya Reaidy – Miss Lebanon 2018
Georgina Rizk – Miss Lebanon 1970/Miss Universe 1971
Pamela Saadé – Miss Earth Lebanon 2008
Christina Sawaya – Miss Lebanon 2001/Miss International 2002
Marlène Talih – Miss Lebanon 1966
Rosarita Tawil – Miss Lebanon 2008

Dancers
 Mousbah Baalbaki –  belly dancer
 Dany Bustros (1959 – 1998) belly dancer, socialite, stage actress
 Alissar Caracalla (born 1974) – dance instructor, choreographer and art director
 Pierre Khadra – dancer, choreographer, and director
 The Mayyas – all-female alternative precision dance group
 Alexandre Paulikevitch – dancer, civil rights activist

Fashion designers
 Reem Acra – fashion designer
Houssein Bazaza – fashion designer
Georges Chakra – fashion designer
Nicolas Jebran – fashion designer
Rabih Kayrouz – fashion designer
Zuhair Murad – fashion designer
Elie Saab – fashion designer
Tony Ward – fashion designer

Film, television, and radio personalities
Hicham Abou Sleiman – actor
Borhane Alaouié – film director
Philippe Aractingi – Lebanese-French film director
Maysa Assaf –  television presenter
Jihad Al-Atrash – actor
Maroun Bagdadi – film director
Hisham Bizri – film director
Rowan Blanchard – American actress
Maguy Bou Ghosn – actress
Lucien Bourjeily – film and theater director, playright, political activist
Bassem Breish – film director
Takla Chamoun – actress
Ely Dagher – film director
Sami Daher – actor
Jean Daoud – film director
George Diab – actor
Ziad Doueiri – film director
Imad Feghaly – actor
Lamitta Frangieh – actress
Daizy Gedeon – Australian-Lebanese filmmaker
Marcel Ghanem – television anchor
Renee Ghosh – actress
Dan Haddad – film director
Abdo Hakim – actor
Hasan Hamdan – actor
Jamal Hamdan – actor
Saad Hamdan – actor
Darine Hamze – actress, director, and producer
Julia Kassar – actress
Sarah Khan - actress
Noor Zafar Khan - actress
Diana Ibrahim – actress
Muhammad Ibrahim – actor
Charbel Iskandar – actor
Leïla Karam – actress
Mona Karim – actress
Mario Kassar – filmmaker, founder of Carolco Pictures
Alek Keshishian – filmmaker of Lebanese-Armenian origin
Georges Khabbaz – actor
Arsinée Khanjian – actress of Lebanese-Armenian origin 
Nadine Labaki – film director
Samir Maalouf – actor
Toni Maalouf – actor
Mahmoud Mabsout – actor
Peter Macdissi – television and film actor
Omar Mikati – actor
Patrick Mubarak – actor
Ismail Nanoua – actor
Samara Nohra – actress
George Noory – television, author, radio
Nour – film actress
Jeanine Pirro - television personality and author
Ouday Raad – actor
Bashar Rahal – Lebanese-Bulgarian actor
Keanu Reeves – Canadian actor 
Fadi Rifai – actor
Milad Rizk – actor
Ali Saad – actor
Hossam Al-Sabah – actor
Khaled El Sayed – actor
Naji Shamil – actor
Omar Al-Shammaa – actor
Omar Sharif - actor
Haaz Sleiman – television and film actor
Rosie Al-Yaziji – actress
Ali Al-Zein – actor

Food & drink 

 Tara Khattar - chef and writer

Models and Internet personalities 

 Annabella Hillal – TV presenterw
 Mia Khalifa – internet personality, former pornographic actress and webcam model
 Myriam Klink – model and entertainer

Singers, composers, and musicians
Nancy Ajram – singer
Ragheb Alama – singer
Ramy Ayach – singer and composer
Julia Boutros – singer
Sami Clark – singer
Djsky – electronic musician
Fairuz – singer
Assi El Hallani – singer
Najwa Karam – singer
Wael Kfoury – singer
Marcel Khalife – singer and composer
Massari – singer
Zaki Nassif – composer, singer
Rahbani brothers – composers
Assi Rahbani
Mansour Rahbani
Ziad Rahbani – musician, actor
Majida El Roumi – singer
Sabah – singer, actress
Wadih El Safi – singer, composer, and musician
Carole Samaha – singer
Nasri Shamseddine – singer
Hamed Sinno – singer-songwriter
Walid Toufic – singer
Melhem Zein  – singer
Nawal Al Zoghbi – singer

Theatre
Dayna Ash – poet, cultural activist
Hassan Alaa Eddin – commonly known as Chouchou or Shoushou, actor, comedian
Jalal Khoury – playwright, theatre director, comedian and artistic editor

Visual artists
Etel Adnan – painter, poet
Faouzi Al-Kach – artist
Joseph Assaf – sculptor
Chaouki Chamoun – painter
Douglas Abdell – sculptor
Moustafa Farroukh – painter
Chawky Frenn – painter and art professor
César Gemayel – painter
Youssef Howayek – sculptor and painter
Wajih Nahlé – painter and calligrapher
Walid Raad – artist
Pierre Sadek – caricaturist
Akram Zaatari – filmmaker, photographer, artist and curator

Writers and poets
Salima Abi Rashed (1887–1919) first Lebanese woman lawyer, journalist
Maroun Abboud (1886–1962) – poet and writer
Elia Abu Madi (1890–1957) – poet
Said Akl (1912–2014) – poet, writer, and thinker
Jeanne Arcache (1902–1961) – Francophone poet and novelist
Zeina Hashem Beck – poet
Nader El-Bizri (living) – philosopher and architect
Butrus al-Bustani (1819–1883) – writer and scholar
Andrée Chedid (1920–2011) – Egyptian-French poet and novelist of Lebanese descent 
Michel Chiha (1891–1954) – writer, journalist, banker
Alexandra Chreiteh (born 1987) – writer
Charles Corm (1894–1963) – writer and businessman
Fawaz Gerges (born 1958) – academic and author
Mai Ghoussoub (1952–2007) – writer, publisher, human rights activist
Zaynab Fawwaz (1860–1914) – poet, historian, women's right activist
Hedy Habra – Lebanese-American poet, novelist, literary critic and professor
Joumana Haddad (born 1970) – writer and feminist
Ounsi el-Hajj (1937–2014) – poet
Salma Hage (born 1942) – writer and cook
Labiba Hashim (1882–1952) – pioneer woman writer and journalist
Jad Hatem (born 1952) – philosopher and poet 
Gibran Khalil Gibran (1883–1931) – artist, author and poet
Anbara Salam Khalidi (1897–1986) – writer, translater, woman emancipation activist
Elias Khoury (born 1948) – novelist and playwright
Vénus Khoury-Ghata (born 1937) – writer
Emily Fares Ibrahim (born 1914) – writer, feminist
Amin Maalouf (born 1949) – novelist
Mago (agricultural writer) – Carthaginian writer, author of an agricultural manual in Punic
 Esther Moyal (1874–1947) – writer and women's rights activist
May Murr (1929–2008) – academic, writer and activist
Jacqueline Massabki (died 2015) – writer and lawyer
Khalil Mutran (1872–1949) – poet and journalist
Mikha'il Na'ima (1889–1988) – religious author and poet
Emily Nasrallah (1931–2018) – novelist, activist
Amin al-Rihani (1876–1940) – writer and politician
Widad Sakakini (1913–1991) – writer and feminist
Georges Schéhadé – (1905–1989) – Francophone playwright and poet
Laurice Schehadé (1908–2009) – Noverlist and poet
Hanan al-Shaykh – writer
Ahmad Faris al-Shidyaq (1806–1887) – scholar, writer and journalist
Avraham Sinai (born 1962) – religious writer
Gabriel Sionita (1577–1648) – Maronite writer and publisher
Amine Takiedine (1884–1937) – poet and writer
Nassim Nicholas Taleb (born 1960) – author
Nadia Tueni (1935–1983) – poet
Ibrahim al-Yaziji (1847–1906) – philosopher, philologist, poet and journalist
Nasif al-Yaziji (1800–1871)  – author 
Warda al-Yaziji (1838–1924) – poet
Iman Humaydan Younes (born 1956) writer, researcher and creative writing professor 
Rania Zaghir (born 1977) – children's author
Nazira Zain al-Din (1908–1976) – literary critic and women emancipation activist
May Ziadeh  (1886–1941) – poet, essayist, and women emancipation activist
Jurji Zaydan (1861–1914) – writer and novelist, journalist

Architecture

Nabil Gholam – architect
Salim Al-Kadi – architect and designer
Joseph Philippe Karam – architect
Nadim Karam – architect
Bernard Khoury – architect

Business
Samir Brikho – businessman, Chief Executive of AMEC
Charles Corm (1894–1963) – writer, industrialist
Walid Daouk – businessman and politician
Ralph Debbas – automotive executive
Carlos Ghosn – former CEO of Michelin North America, Chairman and CEO of Renault, Chairman of AvtoVAZ, Chairman and CEO of Nissan, and Chairman of Mitsubishi Motors
Sam Hammam – owner of Cardiff City F.C.
Hind Hariri (born 1984) – entrepreneur, billionnaire
Nicolas Hayek – owner of Swatch Group
Ziad Raphael Nassar – celebrity wedding designer and entrepreneur, owner of Ziad Rapahel Nassar holding.
Carlos Slim – investor, formerly the richest person in the world
Philippe Ziade – entrepreneur, owner and CEO of Growth Holdings
Rabih Bou Rached - CEO and founder of Falcon Eye Drones
Hussein El-Husseini - Structurer of the WeWork deal

Education
Joseph E. Aoun – President of Northeastern University
Alberto Bustani – former president of Monterrey Campus of Monterrey Institute of Technology and Higher Education
Gabriel Hawawini – former Head and Dean of INSEAD

Journalism
Jad Al-Akhaoui – television and newspaper journalist
May Chidiac – television journalist
Daizy Gedeon – former deputy foreign editor and first female sports journalist (The Australian)
Marcel Ghanem – television journalist
Adnan Al Kakoun – journalist/producer/director
Octavia Nasr – former television journalist for CNN
Ramzi Najjar – journalist and author
Gebran Tueni – founder of An-Nahar
Gebran Ghassan Tueni – Lebanese journalist and politician 
Ghassan Tueni – Lebanese journalist, politician and diplomat
Nayla Tueni (born 1982) – journalist and politician
Paula Yacoubian - television journalist and politician
George Yammine – literature and arts critic of An-Nahar
Philippe Ziade – Journalist

Military
Emile Boustany – former army commander
Jean Kahwaji – former army commander
Samir El-Khadem – former commander of the Lebanese Naval Forces, author, historian
Émile Lahoud – former army commander
Jamil Al Sayyed – former Lebanese General Security Director
Wafiq Jizzini – former Lebanese General Security Director
Abbas Ibrahim – Lebanese General Security Director
Jean Njeim – former army commander
Ibrahim Tannous – former army commander
Joseph Aoun – army commander

Religion
A series of Catholic popes from the Levant (also known as Syrian popes or popes of Eastern Origin) include: Pope Anicetus, Pope Constantine, Pope Gregory III, Pope Sergius I and Pope Sisinnius.

Religious personalities
Maronite patriarchs
Estephan El Douaihy – former Maronite Patriarch (1670–1704)
Elias Peter Hoayek – former Maronite Patriarch (1898–1931)
Anthony Peter Khoraish – former Maronite Patriarch (1975–1986)
Bechara Boutros al-Rahi – Maronite Patriarch (2011–)
Nasrallah Boutros Sfeir – former Maronite Patriarch (1986–2011)

Muslim scholars
Abū ʿAmr ʿAbd al-Raḥmān ibn ʿAmr al-ʾAwzāʿī (Arabic: أبو عمرو عبدُ الرحمٰن بن عمرو الأوزاعي) (707–774)
Musa al-Sadr – Shiite religious leader
Muhammad Jamaluddin al-Makki al-Amili – Shi'a scholar (1334–1385) 
Nur-al-Din al-Karaki al-ʿĀmilī (1465-1534) – Shiite scholar who was a member of the Safavid court
Al-Hurr al-Aamili – muhaddith and a prominent Twelver Shi'a scholar (1624–1693)
Bahāʾ al-dīn al-ʿĀmilī – Shi'a Islamic scholar (1547–1621)
Mohammad Hussein Fadlallah – Shiite cleric (1935–2010)
Hassan Khaled – Sunni cleric, Mufti of the Lebanese Republic (1966–1989)

Others
Aram I Keshishian – Catholicos of the Armenian Apostolic Church, See of the Great House of Cilicia (in Antelias, Lebanon)
Salim Ghazal – Melkite Greek Catholic bishop (1931–2011)

Saints
Charbel Makhlouf
Nimatullah Kassab
Rafqa Pietra Choboq Ar-Rayès
Raphael Hawawini

Politicians

Presidents of Lebanon
NONE - current president
(2022-??)
Michel Aoun – former president (2016–2022)
Camille Chamoun – former president (1952–1958)
Fuad Chehab – former president (1958–1964)
Émile Eddé – former president (1936–1941)
Suleiman Frangieh – former president (1970–1976)
Amine Gemayel – former president (1982–1988)
Bachir Gemayel – former president-elect (1982-murdered)
Charles Helou – former president (1964–1970)
Elias Hrawi – former president (1989–1998)
Bechara El Khoury – former president (1943–1952)
Émile Jamil Lahoud – former president (1998–2007)
René Moawad – former president (1989-murdered)
Elias Sarkis – former president (1976–1982)
Michel Sleiman – former president (2008–2014)
Petro Trad – former president (1943)

Speakers of Parliament
Nabih Berri – Camper on his seats since 1992 (30 years)
Kamel Asaad – former Speaker of Parliament
Sabri Hamadé – former Speaker of Parliament
Hussein el-Husseini – former Speaker of Parliament
Adel Osseiran – former Speaker of Parliament

Prime Ministers of Lebanon
Ahmad Daouk – former Prime Minister
Amin al-Hafez – former Prime Minister
Rafic Hariri – former Prime Minister
Saad Hariri – former Prime Minister
Selim al-Hoss – former Prime Minister
Omar Karami – former Prime Minister
Rashid Karami – former Prime Minister
Najib Mikati – former Prime Minister
Saeb Salam – former Prime Minister
Tammam Salam – former Prime Minister
Fouad Siniora – former Prime Minister
Riad as-Solh – former Prime Minister
Sami as-Solh – former Prime Minister
Takieddin el-Solh – former Prime Minister
Shafik Wazzan – former Prime Minister
Abdallah El-Yafi – former Prime Minister
Chafic Al Wazzan – former Prime Minister
Hussain Alouieni – former Prime Minister
Omar Karami – former Prime Minister
Hassan Diab – former Prime Minister

Political personalities
Marwan Hamadeh – former minister (6 times) and part of the Lebanese Parliament since 1992, politician and influential presence
Emir Majid Arslan – Lebanese independence leader
Prince Talal Arslan – Druze leader and president of the Lebanese Democratic Party
Gebran Bassil – minister, Free Patriotic Movement
Dany Chamoun – former National Liberal Party leader
Dory Chamoun – National Liberal Party leader
Khaled Daouk – former Honorary Consul General of Ireland in Beirut
Walid Daouk – former minister of Information and Justice
Carlos Edde – politician
Raymond Edde – politician, former leader of National Bloc
Issam Fares – businessman and politician, former Deputy Prime Minister
Suleiman Frangieh, Jr. – politician, leader of the Marada Movement
Tony Frangieh – politician
Maurice Gemayel – founder of Institute for Palestine Studies
Pierre Gemayel – politician and founder of the Kataeb Party
Pierre Amine Gemayel – legislator and minister
Samir Geagea – leader of the Lebanese Forces
Kamal Jumblatt – founder of Progressive Socialist Party
Walid Jumblatt – politician, leader of the Progressive Socialist Party
Sobhi Mahmassani – legal scholar, former deputy and minister 
Charles Malik – former president of the United Nations General Assembly and Minister of Foreign Affairs
Nayla Moawad – politician
Elias Murr – former deputy prime minister
Gabriel Murr – politician; owner of Murr Television and Mount Lebanon Radio Station
Michel Murr – politician and former Deputy Prime Minister
Hassan Nasrallah – leader of Hezbollah
Salim Saadeh – economist and politician
Habib Sadek – former politician, writer
Violette Khairallah Safadi (born 1981) – politician, television personality and social activist
Gebran Tueni – journalist and deputy
Talal El Merhebi – politician and former deputy and minister, leader of Akkar area

Other political personalities
Alain Aoun – nephew of President Michel Aoun
Joyce Gemayel – former first lady and political activist
Ghassan Tueni – diplomat, politician and journalist

Sciences

Medicine
Afif Abdul Wahab – surgeon
Amin J. Barakat – Lebanese-American physician known for the diagnosis Barakat syndrome
Anthony Atala – Director of the Wake Forest Institute for Regenerative Medicine
Edma Abouchdid – physician; first Lebanese woman to obtain a doctorate of medicine
Sami Ibrahim Haddad – physician, surgeon and writer
Michael Debakey – renowned Lebanese-American Cardiovascular Surgeon who pioneered many surgical techniques and procedures
Saniya Habboub – medical doctor known for being the first Lebanese woman to study medicine abroad
Ali A Haydar – physician who is an emeritus professor at the American University of Beirut
Israa Seblani – physician and endocrinologist
Afif Abdul Wahab – medical doctor, general surgeon and urologist
Michael DeBakey – American vascular surgeon and cardiac surgeon
Emile Riachi – renowned orthopaedic surgeon
Fuad Sami Haddad – neurosurgeon, humanitarian, and writer
Sami A. Sanjad – Lebanese-American pediatrician
Tony Nader – neuroscientist, university president, author and leader of the Transcendental Meditation movement.
Farid Fata – hematologist/oncologist and the mastermind of one of the largest health care frauds in U.S. history.
Nabil F. Saba – oncologist and professor of hematology and medical oncology at Emory University School of Medicine
Elias I. Traboulsi – physician in the fields of ophthalmic genetics and pediatric ophthalmology
Toni Choueiri – Lebanese American medical oncologist and researcher
Naji Abumrad – Lebanese-American surgeon

Psychiatry 
Aziz al-Abub – psychiatrist and medical torture expert affiliated with Hezbollah
Hagop S. Akiskal – psychiatrist and professor

Scientists

Archeology 
Maurice Chehab – archaeologist and museum curator, father of "modern Lebanese archaeology"
George El Andary – researcher in archaeology, museums and manuscripts
Leila Badre – director of the Archaeological Museum of the American University of Beirut
Maya Haïdar Boustani – archaeologist and curator of the Museum of Lebanese Prehistory
Assaad Seif – archaeologist and Associate Professor in Archaeology at the Lebanese University

Astronomy 

 Charles Elachi – astronomer and professor of electrical engineering, former director of Jet Propulsion Laboratory and vice president of Caltech
 Doris Daou – Director for Education and Public Outreach of the NASA Lunar Science Institute

Biology 
 Pierre Zalloua – biologist and researcher
 M. Amin Arnaout – nephrologist best known for seminal discoveries in the biology and structure of integrin receptors.
 Myrna T. Semaan – botanist, notable for identifying a number of new plant species in Lebanon with Ricardius M. Haber.
 Asmar Asmar – specialization in cardiology
 Huda Zoghbi – Lebanese-born American geneticist
 Jack Makari – Lebanese-American cancer immunologist
 Justine Sergent – researcher in the cognitive neuroscience field

Chemistry and materials science 

 Niveen Khashab – chemist and professor known for her contributions in the field of drugs and Chemistry, L'Oréal-UNESCO For Women in Science Awards laureate
 Hassan Naim – Lebanese-Swiss biochemist
 Mona Nemer – Lebanese-Canadian biochemist
 Najat A. Saliba – Professor of Analytical Chemistry and an atmospheric chemist at the American University of Beirut
 Ziad Rafiq Beydoun – petroleum geologist and Emeritus Professor at the American University of Beirut
 George Doumani – Lebanese Palestinian geologist and explorer

Computing and engineering 
Mario El-Khoury – Lebanese-Swiss engineer and business executive
Hassan Kamel Al-Sabbah – Lebanese-American electrical and electronic engineer and technology innovator known for receiving 43 patents in television transmission
Nadim Kobeissi – French-Lebanese computer science researcher specialized in applied cryptography

Physics 
Ali Chamseddine – physicist known for his contributions in particle physics, general relativity and mathematical physics
Edgar Choueiri – Physicist known for his work on Plasma propulsion engine and for conceiving and developing new spacecraft propulsion concepts
Rammal Rammal – condensed matter physicist
Ani Aprahamian – Lebanese-born Armenian-American nuclear physicist
Eid Hourany –  nuclear physicist
Hassan Khachfe – innovator, researcher and professor
Salwa Nassar – nuclear physicist and college administrator known for being the first Lebanese woman to earn a PhD in physics

Bahāʾ al-dīn al-ʿĀmilī – Islamic scholar, philosopher, architect, mathematician, astronomer and poet
Rammal Rammal – condensed matter physicist
Ghassan Afiouni – inventor, developed a king of compressed wood that cannot be burned

Sports personalities

Athletes
Samir Bannout – Lebanese-American professional bodybuilder who won the prestigious Mr. Olympia competition in 1983. Nicknamed the "Lion of Lebanon"
Maxime Chaya – extreme sports athlete
Zakaria Chihab – sportsman and Olympian
Nabil Choueiri – track and field athlete and Olympian
Maya Nassar – fitness model

American/Canadian football
David Azzi – football player in the Canadian Football League (CFL)

Automobile racing
Khalil Beschir – professional race car driver
Tony Kanaan – professional race car driver
Noel Jammal – professional race car driver
Felipe Nasr – professional race car driver
Graham Rahal – professional race car driver
Toni Breidinger – professional race car driver

Baseball
Joe Lahoud – Lebanese-American retired baseball player who played in the Major Leagues for over 11 years for five different teams (Boston Red Sox, California Angels, Texas Rangers, Milwaukee Brewers and the Kansas City Royals). His two sons, Joe Jr. and Nick Lahoud, played Minor League Baseball.

Basketball
Rony Fahed – basketball player
Matt Freije – basketball player
Fadi El Khatib – basketball player
Ali Mahmoud – basketball player 
Elie Mechantaf – basketball player
Rony Seikaly – Lebanese-American professional basketball player
Joe Vogel – professional basketball player and member of Lebanon's national team
Jackson Vroman – professional basketball player and member of Lebanon's national team
Wael Arakji – basketball player

Ice hockey
Ed Hatoum – former professional hockey player for the Vancouver Canucks
Nazem Kadri – professional hockey player for the Toronto Maple Leafs

Playing card tournament titleholders
Kassem 'Freddy' Deeb 
Ihsan 'Sammy' Farha 
Joseph 'Joe' Hachem

Football
Faisal Antar – football (soccer) player
Roda Antar – soccer player
Mohammed Ghaddar – soccer player in Syria
Wartan Ghazarian – soccer player of Armenian origin
Moussa Hojeij – soccer player/manager
Youssef Mohamad – soccer player in Germany 
Soony Saad – soccer player
Jamal Taha – soccer player

Skiing
Ibrahim Jaja

Rugby league
Hazem El Masri – Canterbury-Bankstown Bulldogs player and highest NRL point scorer
Anthony Farah – hooker for the West Tigers in the New South Wales Cup
Wayne Chahoud – played for the Parramatta Eels in the New South Wales Cup
Liam Ayoub – plays for the Penrith Panthers in the NRL

Rugby Union
Ahmad Harajly – World Rugby Sevens Series USA Rugby player and first Arab American rugby athlete to represent the USA. Professional athlete for Major League Rugby for the New England Free Jacks

See also
Lebanese diaspora
List of Lebanese people (Diaspora)

References